Traitor's Knot is volume seven of the Wars of Light and Shadow by Janny Wurts. It is also volume four of the Alliance of Light, the third story arc in the Wars of Light and Shadow.

External links
Traitor's Knot Webpage
Traitor's Knot Excerpt

2004 American novels
American fantasy novels
Wars of Light and Shadow
Alliance of Light
Voyager Books books